Corylus ferox, the Himalayan hazelnut or Tibetan hazelnut, is a species of hazel native to the Himalayas of eastern Asia.

Description 
The flowers are wind-pollinated catkins and precocious. The male (pollen) catkins are pendulous with numerous solitary flowers and no perianth, while the female catkins are inconspicuous, 6-8 scaly buds and perianth adnate.

References

ferox
Edible nuts and seeds
Plants described in 1844
Trees of China
Trees of the Indian subcontinent
Trees of Myanmar